Walter Steinegger (born 5 November 1928) is an Austrian former ski jumper who competed from 1952 to 1963. He finished 14th in the individual large hill at the 1952 Winter Olympics in Oslo. He was born in Innsbruck. Steinegger's best career finish was third in the individual normal hill in West Germany in 1957. He also competed in the 1960 Winter Olympics in Squaw Valley as well, finishing 16th in the individual large hill.

External links

Olympic ski jumping results: 1948-60
Walter Steinegger's profile at Sports Reference.com

Austrian male ski jumpers
Olympic ski jumpers of Austria
Ski jumpers at the 1952 Winter Olympics
Ski jumpers at the 1960 Winter Olympics
Living people
1928 births
Sportspeople from Innsbruck